The word wingback has several senses:

Wing chair, a type of high-backed chair
Wingback (American football), is one of several varieties of running backs in the wing T formation
Wing-back (association football), a defensive position